Put Yourself In My Place is the second studio album from American country music artist Pam Tillis. It was also her first album for Arista Records, following 1983's Above and Beyond the Doll of Cutey, released on Warner Bros. Records. Put Yourself in My Place reached number 10 on the Top Country Albums charts. Five singles were released from the album: "Don't Tell Me What to Do", followed by "One of Those Things", the title track, "Maybe It Was Memphis" and "Blue Rose Is". The album has been certified Gold for shipments of more than 500,000 copies in the U.S.

"Ancient History" was later covered by Prairie Oyster on the album Only One Moon. Their version was a number five hit on the RPM country charts.

Track listing

Personnel
Eddie Bayers - drums
Bruce Bouton - steel guitar
Dennis Burnside - piano
Larry Byrom - electric guitar
Ashley Cleveland - background vocals
Steve Gibson - electric guitar
Vicki Hampton - background vocals
Carl Jackson - acoustic guitar
John Jorgenson - electric guitar
Paul Leim - drums
Mark O'Connor - fiddle, mandolin
Matt Rollings - piano
Karen Staley - background vocals
Harry Stinson - background vocals
Pam Tillis - lead vocals, background vocals
Tricia Walker - background vocals
Glenn Worf - bass guitar
Technical
Paul Worley - producer
Ed Seay - producer, mixing, engineering
Anthony Martin - production assistant
Carlos Grier - digital editing
Mike Poole - mix & recording assistant

Charts

Weekly charts

Year-end charts

Certifications

References

1991 albums
Arista Records albums
Pam Tillis albums
Albums produced by Paul Worley